Sarnen railway station is a Swiss railway station on the Brünig line, owned by the Zentralbahn, that links Lucerne and Interlaken. The station is in the municipality of Sarnen in the canton of Obwalden.

Services 
The following services stop at Sarnen Nord:

 Lucerne S-Bahn:

References

External links 
 

Railway stations in the canton of Obwalden
Sarnen
Zentralbahn stations